Ptarmigan Falls is a waterfall located in Glacier National Park, Montana, US. The falls can only be seen by hiking west on the Ptarmigan Trail from Swiftcurrent Auto Camp Historic District in the Many Glacier region of the park.

References

Landforms of Glacier County, Montana
Landforms of Glacier National Park (U.S.)
Waterfalls of Glacier National Park (U.S.)